José Fernando Ramírez (5 May 1804 – 4 March 1871) was a distinguished Mexican historian in the 19th century. He was a mentor of Alfredo Chavero, who considered him "the foremost of our historians."

Ramírez was born in Parral, Chihuahua but grew up in Durango, where he became a prominent liberal politician. After graduating with a degree in law from San Luis Gonzaga he was elected several times to the Chamber of Deputies and the Senate. He chaired the Ministry of Foreign affairs under three different administrations and became a minister in the Supreme Court of Justice.

Ramírez specialized in prehispanic and sixteenth-century Mexican history and excelled as a biographer. During the Second Mexican Empire, he headed the Imperial Academy of Sciences and Literature during the Second Mexican Empire, directed the National Museum (1852) and built an impressive collection of historical documents. Among his works  are one on Toribio de Benavente Motolinia and several translations of Aztec codices such as Mapa Quinatzin and Codex Aubin. He was elected a member of the American Antiquarian Society in 1862. A bibliography of his writings on Mesoamerican ethnohistory appears in the Handbook of Middle American Indians.

After the fall of the Empire and execution of Emperor Maximilian, he left for Europe, likely because of his official roles in the French intervention. His achievements as a scholar of Mexican history are untarnished by his political role.  He died in Bonn, Germany on 4 March 1871.

References

External links
Academia Mexicana de la Lengua: José Fernando Ramírez (in Spanish).
José Fernando Ramírez: su último exilio europeo y la suerte de su última biblioteca (in Spanish).

19th-century Mexican historians
1804 births
1871 deaths
People from Parral, Chihuahua
19th-century Mesoamericanists
Historians of Mesoamerica
Mexican Mesoamericanists
Members of the American Antiquarian Society